Stade Olympique Voironnais (SOV) is a rugby union club from the city of Voiron (Isère, France). They are currently competing in the Fédérale 3 French championship (5th division).

History 
February 20, 1900 :
Birth rugby Voiron in the colors of "Union  Athlétique Voironnaise"
1908 :
Creating a second club "Union cycliste Voironnaise"
1918 :
Merger of two clubs under the name "Voiron Olympique Club"
1947 :
Creation of the "Stade Olympique Voironnais"
1956 :
Accession SOV in 3rd Division
1961 :
Accession SOV 2nd Division
1976 :
First accession SOV 1st Division
August 27, 2006 :
the SOV between the old elite Clubs

Awards 
1930 :
V.O.C is the Champion of the Alps Honor
1986 :
Championship finalist France 1st Division Group B
Accession 1st Division Group A
1990 :
Second season in the first division Group A
2000 :
Quarter finalist France Federal Championship 3
2001 :
Winner of Challenge France Telecom Paris (-15 years)
2008 :
Half Championship finalist France Federal 3
2014 :
 Winner of championship France Federal 3 B (reserve team)

Voiron